Michael Francis Kruczek (born March 15, 1953) is an American football coach and former quarterback. He is currently the head varsity coach for Trinity Preparatory School of Florida.

Playing career
Kruczek earned All-America in 1975 as a quarterback at Boston College where he set several B.C. passing and total offense records.

 1974: 104/151 for 1,275 yards with 6 TD vs 7 INT
 1975: 107/164 for 1,132 yards with 6 TD vs 7 INT

He was selected in the second round of the 1976 NFL Draft by the Pittsburgh Steelers and played in 29 games for them from 1976 to 1979 and was a member of Super Bowl championship squads in 1978 and 1979.

Kruczek distinguished himself in the NFL by winning six consecutive starts as a rookie in 1976 when he stepped into the Steelers starting lineup for an injured Terry Bradshaw; buoyed by the historic rushing duo of Franco Harris and Rocky Bleier (who became only the second pair of teammates to each run for 1,000 yards in the same season), and a fierce defense which recorded three shutouts and allowed only 25 points (4.2 ppg) during his six starts, Kruczek helped lead the Steelers to the AFC title game. During the victory streak Kruczek did not throw a touchdown pass, however for the season he completed passes at an impressive 60% rate along with an excellent average of 8.9 yards/attempt, and a solid 74.5 passer rating (compared to the league average rating of 67.0).

Kruczek's record for consecutive wins as a rookie stood until 1985 when it was broken by Los Angeles Rams quarterback Dieter Brock who, at age 34, won seven consecutive starts to begin his first NFL season.  Brock was an unusual rookie, having spent his prior 11 years (1974-1984) playing professionally in the Canadian Football League before joining the Rams.

Taking the more conventional route (college to the NFL), in 2004 a Pittsburgh quarterback again claimed the consecutive rookie wins record when 22-year-old Steelers rookie Ben Roethlisberger won 13 games to begin his career.

Kruczek concluded his NFL career in 1980 with the Washington Redskins. During his career Kruczek never threw a touchdown pass in a regular season game and currently holds the league record for career pass attempts, 154, without a touchdown.

Coaching career
Kruczek began his coaching career as the quarterbacks coach for Bobby Bowden at Florida State from 1982 to 1983. He served one season in the same capacity for the Jacksonville Bulls of the USFL before he became the offensive coordinator and quarterbacks coach at the University of Central Florida. He was named UCF's head coach in 1998 when 13-year coach Gene McDowell was forced to resign due to a cellular phone fraud scandal.  Kruczek's run as coach benefited from the fact that he inherited future NFL Pro Bowl quarterback Daunte Culpepper as a recruit from the McDowell era.

Kruczek led the fledgling Division I-A program to some of its biggest successes.  In his first season, he led the Knights to a 9–2 record and had a verbal commitment to playing in the first Oahu Bowl.  However, those plans were dashed when Miami upset undefeated UCLA, and the resulting domino effect left the Knights out of what would have been their first bowl game ever.  Another highlight was an upset win over the 3–8 University of Alabama Crimson Tide in 2000, which gave UCF its first victory over a program from a Bowl Championship Series automatic qualifying conference.

Kruczek's UCF Knights squad joined the Mid-American Conference as a football-only member starting in the 2002 season, with many pundits expecting the team to win the MAC's Eastern Division championship.  After a successful debut season in 2002 in which Kruczek's team finished 7–5 and earned second place in the MAC East, UCF struggled mightily in 2003, going 3–9.  Starting quarterback Ryan Schneider was dismissed from the team for academic violations and UCF had a 3–7 record before Kruczek was dismissed with two games remaining in the season.  After a loss to MAC bottom dweller Eastern Michigan, Kruczek was fired despite having signed a three-year contract extension at the start of the season.  Kruczek was replaced by George O'Leary for the 2004 season.

Personal life
Kruczek and his wife, Leigh, have two children: a daughter, Kelly, and a son, Garrett.

Head coaching record

College

References

1953 births
Living people
American football quarterbacks
Arizona Cardinals coaches
Boston College Eagles football players
Florida State Seminoles football coaches
National Football League offensive coordinators
Pittsburgh Steelers players
Sacramento Mountain Lions coaches
UCF Knights football coaches
UMass Minutemen football coaches
United States Football League coaches
Washington Redskins players
High school football coaches in Florida
Coaches of American football from Washington, D.C.
Players of American football from Washington, D.C.